Marko Antić (born 22 June 1991 in Mladenovac, Serbia) is a Serbian karate athlete competing in kumite -60 kg division.

Achievements 
2017
  European Karate Championships – TUR – kumite -60 kg
2016
  European Karate Championships – FRA – kumite -60 kg
  Karate1 Premier League – AUT – Kumite -60 kg
2015
 5TH PLACE European Karate Championships – TUR – kumite -60 kg
2014
  Balkan Senior Championships – MKD – Kumite -60 kg
2012
  World Karate Championships – FRA – kumite -60 kg
2011
 5TH PLACE European Karate Championships – SUI – Kumite -60 kg
2009
  EKF Junior, Cadet And U21 Championships – FRA – Junior Kumite -61 kg

References

1991 births
Living people
Serbian male karateka
European Games competitors for Serbia
Karateka at the 2015 European Games